The men's shot put event at the 2019 Summer Universiade was held on 8 July at the Stadio San Paolo in Naples.

Medalists

Results

Qualification
Qualification: 19.70 m (Q) or at least 12 best (q) qualified for the final.

Final

References

Shot
2019